Indravati River  is a tributary of the Godavari River, in central India.

The Indravati River
is a stream of the river Godavari. Its starting point, found to be the Ghats of Dandakaranya, range from a hilltop village Mardiguda of Thuamula Rampur Block in the Kalahandi district of the state of Odisha. Due to the amalgamation of three streams, The River follows a westerly path and enters Jagadalpur in the state of Chhattisgarh.
The river moves from here in a southern route, before eventually uniting with the Godavari at the borders of three states. They are the state of Chhattisgarh, Maharashtra and Telangana. The river at a variety of stages of its course forms the boundary between Chhattisgarh and Maharashtra.
The river Indravati is also known as the oxygen of the Bastar district of state of Chhattisgarh. This district is one of the greenest and eco-friendly districts, found in the whole of India.
A total number of five hydroelectric projects were planned on the river Indravati. They were namely the Kutru I, the Kutro II, the Nugru I, Nugru II and the Bhopalpatnam. However, the plan misfired and did not see the light of the day due to ecological reasons.
The Indravati is sometimes known as the "lifeline" of the Kalahandi, Nabarangapur, of Odisha & Bastar district of Chhattisgarh, one of the greenest districts in India.

Most of the river course is through dense forests of Nabarangapur & Bastar.

Mythology behind origin of Source 
There is a Hindu mythological story behind the formation of Indravati River. Once upon a time the place was full of Champa and Chandan trees, which fragranced the whole forest. Due to such a beautiful place on earth, Lord Indra and Indrani went down from Heaven to stay here for a while. They deeply enjoyed the beauty of nature; while wandering in the jungle Indra went to a small village Sunabeda (Nuapada district), where he met with a beautiful girl Udanti. At first meet, they fall in love with each others; and Indra disagreed to get back. On other side, due to disband or separation Indrani cried sorrowfully and expressed her pain to the people, where gathered there. People knew well about the Indra and Udanti; they informed the same to Indrani and suggested to stay there. Indrani got irate over Indra and pour scorn on Indra and Udanti so that they never meet again and she stayed there as Indravati River, which flows till date. And, Indra and Udanti rivers are also flowing there separately, without meeting each other due to offense of Indrani.

Source and flow

It has a well-defined course from its origin to its confluence with the Godavari River. Starting in a south-east direction as a small rivulet in Odisha, it later runs in western direction through Bastar district of Chhattisgarh until it is deflected and runs north-west and then again takes a turn to the south-west. Its bed level at its junction with the Godavari River is of the order of R.L. 82.3 m compared to the level in Kalahandi from where it takes off is 914.4m.

Indravati and Sabari are interconnected naturally in Odisha area. Indravati waters overflow into the Sabari through Jaura Nallah during floods..

Tributaries
The major tributaries of river Indravati are Keshadhara Nalla, Kandabindha Nallah, Chandragiri Nalla, Golagar Nalla, Poragarh Nalla, Kapur Nallah, Muran River, Bangiri Nallah, Telengi Nallah, Parlijori Nallah, Turi Nallah, Chourijori Nallah, Damayanti Sayarh, Kora river, Modang river, Padrikundijori river, Jaura river and Bhaskel river.

The important right bank tributaries of the Indravati are Bhaskel, Boarding, Narangi, Nimbra (Parlkota), Kotri and Bandia.  The important left bank tributary is Nandiraj.

Indravati Dam 

Indravati Dam or Upper Indravati Hydro Power Project built near Mukhiguda, Kalahandi is one of the largest Dam in India as well as Asia. It is the largest dam in eastern India which produces 600MW of electricity. The Upper Indravati Project envisages diversion of water, of the Indravati river in its upper reaches into the Mahanadi valley for power generation and irrigation.

Other Dam proposals

A total of five hydroelectric projects (Kutru I, Kutru II, Nugur I, Nugur II and Bhopalpatnam) were planned on the stretch of Indravati River at various points in time. But none could see the light of the day due to ecological concerns raised in various fora.

According to Interstate Agreement as per Godavari Water Disputes Tribunal (GWDT) Report, the State of Odisha has to ensure  (45 TMC) of water at the Odisha–Chhattisgarh border.

Ecology 

Indravati National Park and Tiger Reserves are located in the adjoining region of Chhattisgarh state. The Chitrakot fall is almost at the point of its extinct because of indiscriminate construction of check dams near the fall. Social Activists and environmentalists are hell bent on getting the charm of the fall back. Now the fall is worth viewing during the rainy seasons only.

See also 

List of rivers of India
Rivers of India
Icchampally Project
Eastern States Union

References

External links 

 Indravati Power Station from Internet Archive
 Damning the Indravati? from Internet Archive

Rivers of Chhattisgarh
Rivers of Maharashtra
Rivers of Odisha
Rivers of Telangana
Tributaries of the Godavari River
Rivers of India